Secret Affair is a 2014 South Korean television series starring Kim Hee-ae and Yoo Ah-in. It aired on cable channel JTBC from March 17 to May 13, 2014 on Mondays and Tuesdays at 21:50 (KST) time slot for 16 episodes.

A story about a married woman in her 40s who has an affair with a pianist in his 20s, the romance melodrama explores the struggle between attraction and societal expectation.

Synopsis
Oh Hye-won (Kim Hee-ae) is a 40-year-old woman who feels that she's leading a fulfilling life. Elegant, sophisticated and excellent at dealing with people, she spares no effort in her quest for success as the director of planning for the Seohan Arts Foundation. But then she meets Lee Sun-jae (Yoo Ah-in), a 20-year-old genius pianist from an impoverished background, who is unaware of his ability and works as a quick delivery guy. Hye-won experiences for the first time what truly falling in love is like, and she and Sun-jae begin a passionate affair which they must keep secret because it threatens to unravel both their lives.

Cast

Main
 Kim Hee-ae as Oh Hye-won, director of planning
 Yoo Ah-in as Lee Sun-jae
 Park Hyuk-kwon as Kang Joon-hyung, music professor

People of Seohan Arts Foundation
 Shim Hye-jin as Han Seong-sook, chairwoman of the foundation
 Kim Hye-eun as Seo Young-woo, president of the Seoul Arts Center
 Kim Yong-gun as Seo Pil-won

People around Sun-jae
 Kyung Soo-jin as Park Da-mi
 Choi Tae-hwan as Son Jang-ho
 Lee Kan-hee as Myung-hwa

People of Seohan School of Music
 Kim Chang-wan as Min Yong-ki
 Park Jong-hoon as Jo In-seo 
 Shin Ji-ho as Ji Min-woo 
 Jin Bora as Jung Yoo-ra
 Yang Min-young as Kim In-joo

Others
 Yoon Bok-in as Yoon Ji-soo
 Gil Hae-yeon as Ms. Baek
 Baek Ji-won as Wang Jeong-hee
 Jang So-yeon as Ahn Se-jin
 Jeong Eui-soon as Mi-soon
 Heo Jung-do as Im Jong-soo
 Kim Kwon as Shin Woo-sung
 Kim Shin-jae as Jang Shi-eun
 Seo Jeong-yeon as Korean-Chinese ajumma
 Choi Hyun-sook as Ok-jin
 Jang Hyun-sung as Kim In-kyum (guest appearance, episode 10-16)
 Lee Moo-saeng as Chief Lim

Awards and nominations

References

External links
  
 
 

2014 South Korean television series debuts
2014 South Korean television series endings
JTBC television dramas
Korean-language television shows
South Korean melodrama television series
South Korean romance television series
Television series by Drama House